The canton of Cerizay is an administrative division of the Deux-Sèvres department, western France. Its borders were modified at the French canton reorganisation which came into effect in March 2015. Its seat is in Cerizay.

It consists of the following communes:
 
L'Absie
Bretignolles
Cerizay
Chanteloup
La Chapelle-Saint-Laurent
Cirières
Clessé
Combrand
Courlay
La Forêt-sur-Sèvre
Largeasse
Moncoutant-sur-Sèvre
Montravers
Neuvy-Bouin
Le Pin
Saint-André-sur-Sèvre
Saint-Paul-en-Gâtine
Trayes

References

Cantons of Deux-Sèvres